Operário Futebol Clube, often known as Operário FC or Operário Ltda. is a Brazilian football team from Várzea Grande, Mato Grosso, founded on 8 August 2002. The club played in the Campeonato Brasileiro Série C once, in 2006.

History

The club was founded on 8 August 2002 in the place of Esporte Clube Operário, which was then founded in 1994 to replace dissolved side CE Operário Várzea-Grandense. After inheriting ECOs place, the club played in the 2003 Copa do Brasil and was knocked out by Palmeiras.

In 2005, Operário lifted their first trophy by winning the year's Copa FMF, after defeating Mixto in the finals. They also won the Campeonato Mato-Grossense in the following year, after defeating Barra do Garças, and played in the ensuing Campeonato Brasileiro Série C.

In 2009, after the latter returned to an active status, a merger proposal was lifted, but the move did not materialize. In that year, Operário FC played in the first division, while CEOV played in the second division. CEOV was again licensed in 2010, as Operário finished second in that year's Matogrossense.

Both CEOV and Operário FC faced each other in 2013, 2016, 2017 and 2019; both were playing in the second division in the first encounters, while the remaining ones all took part in the first division. In 2017, after being relegated to the second level, Operário was sold through a social media.

In 2018, Operário FC changed colours to differentiate from CEOV. In 2019, after being relegated from the first division, Operário chose not to play in the 2020 second division.

Women's team
The club's women's team took part in the 2020 Campeonato Brasileiro de Futebol Feminino Série A2, after winning the Campeonato Mato-Grossense de Futebol Feminino in the previous year.

Honours
Campeonato Mato-Grossense: 1
2006

Campeonato Mato-Grossense Second Division: 2
2015, 2018

Copa FMF: 1
2005

References

External links
 

Association football clubs established in 2002
Football clubs in Mato Grosso
 
2002 establishments in Brazil